This article lists the colonial governors of the Dutch Gold Coast. During the Dutch presence on the Gold Coast, which lasted from 1598 to 1872, the title of the head of the colonial government changed several times:

1675–1798: Director-General (Dutch: directeur-generaal)
1798–1810: Governor-General (Dutch: gouverneur-generaal)
1810–1815: Commandant-General (Dutch: commandant-generaal)
1815–1819: Governor-General (Dutch: gouverneur-generaal)
1819–1838: Commander (Dutch: kommandeur)
1838–1872: Governor (Dutch: gouverneur)

List
Dates in italics indicate de facto continuation of office.

Direct Dutch rule (1612–1621)
Before the establishment of the Dutch West India Company on 3 June 1621, Dutch traders nominally were at the direct control of the Dutch government. Initially, the regulation of trade was left to the traders themselves, but after the building of Fort Nassau at Mouri in 1612, a general was installed to administrate the new colony.

Dutch West India Company rule (1621–1791)

There are many lists available of Director-Generals of the Gold Coast in service of the Dutch West India Company, all with slightly conflicting names and dates. The most accurate information is available for the eighteenth century, as Harvey Feinberg compiled a list of Director-Generals of that century on the basis of day registries available at the Nationaal Archief.

Direct Dutch rule (1792–1872)
The Dutch West India Company was dissolved in 1791, and its colonies reverted to the rule of the States-General of the Dutch Republic on 1 January 1792. The last Director-General installed by the Dutch West India Company, Jacobus de Veer, became the first Director-General under the direct authority of the Dutch Republic. The Dutch Republic was succeeded by the Batavian Republic and the Kingdom of Holland, which all inherited the rule over the colony.

Although the Kingdom of Holland was incorporated into the First French Empire, the colony on the Gold Coast was never occupied by either France or Great-Britain. Dutch rule continued under the Kingdom of the Netherlands proclaimed in 1815, until the cession of the possessions on the Gold Coast to the United Kingdom in 1872.

See also
Ghana
Heads of State of Ghana
Heads of Government of Ghana
Gold Coast
Colonial Heads of Ghana (Gold Coast)
Colonial Heads of Danish Gold Coast
Lists of office holders

Notes

References
 
 
 

 01
L
Dutch Gold Coast, Governors
Colonial governors of the Dutch Gold Coast
Gold Coast

de:Liste der Gouverneure von Ghana#niederländische Gouverneure
nl:Lijst van Directeurs-Generaal op de Goudkust